Holek is a Czech surname. Notable people with the surname include:

 Mario Holek (born 1986), Czech footballer
 Martin Holek (born 1989), Czech footballer
 Stan Holek (born 1933), Canadian professional wrestler
 Václav Holek, Czech firearm engineer

 Czech-language surnames